The El Paso Public Libraries is the municipal public library system of El Paso, Texas. The library serves the needs the public in El Paso, Texas, Chaparral, New Mexico and Ciudad Juarez, Mexico. It consists of 14 branches and one Bookmobile service. Multiple outreach services are also available including a Homebound service.

The main collection consists of 902,521 items in multiple formats including books, reference, downloadable eBooks, audiobooks, music and movies, DVDs, CDs, large-print books, magazines, and newspapers. Special Collections include a Government Documents Collection, Border Heritage Collection, and RAZA Collection.

History

Beginnings
The El Paso Public Library is the longest continuously active public library system in Texas. It was founded by Mary Irene Stanton, an El Paso area teacher. Stanton "single-handedly becomes founder of the El Paso Public Library" when in 1894, she donated her personal collection of 1,000 books for a boy's Reading Club which was housed in a room in the Sheldon Building. On June 1, 1895, women were also allowed to access this collection. In 1895, the El Paso Library Association was formed, with Mary Stanton as the president, to support further library efforts.  On December 4, 1899, 4,000 books that were collectively owned by both Mary I. Stanton and Fannie J. Clark were moved from their location in the Sheldon Hotel to El Paso City Hall. Mary I. Stanton was the original librarian. She began cataloging the books in 1899. In 1900, Belle F. Read takes over as librarian.

Citizens wanted to have a separate library. Petitions were formed and circulated for the library to have its own location. Finally, assistance from Andrew Carnegie came in 1902. The Carnegie Foundation provided the El Paso Library Association a grant totaling $37,500 to build a separate library building to house the growing collection. In agreement with the "Carnegie Formula" which stipulates that a municipality must also provide support for the public library, the City Council agreed to vote in a tax to support the building efforts. The new library would be built on an old cemetery site, Buckler Square. The Library opened on April 25, 1904 in the newly named "Carnegie Square."

The Library Grows

The new Carnegie library needed repair by 1919 and the collection had outgrown the building. In fact, many books were housed by operating "branches" in four different drug and grocery stores throughout El Paso starting in 1915. A second story needed to be added to the original Carnegie building. In 1920, the library's book collection is moved temporarily to the courthouse so that construction could take place. In 1945, a second official branch library is opened at the Tays Housing Project. In 1950, the Memorial Park Branch was opened. The Lower Valley Branch opened in 1960. In 1961, two branches: Richard Burges Branch and the Josephine Clardy Fox Branch were opened. In 1957, a Bookmobile was in operation with a second to serve underprivileged communities in El Paso to start operations in 1972.

By 1943, the library's collections had again outgrown its original downtown building. By 1951, a bond issue was approved by El Paso voters for $975,000 to build a new, larger library. The new library opened on September 12, 1954. The building was described as "Modern Southwestern" and contained artistic contributions from artists Tom Lea, Jose Cisneros and Ewing Waterhouse. The original Carnegie Building was demolished in 1968.

Outstanding Early Collections

In 1906, the El Paso Public Library was designated a Federal Depository as part of the Federal Depository Library Program.  In 1908, the library began a Spanish-language collection of books. Later, librarian, Maud Durlin Sullivan would add to the Spanish language collection as well as grow a nationally recognized art and southwestern studies collection through the aid of donations and special funds. Maud Sullivan taught herself Spanish in order to better select appropriate books for the library's collection. Maud Sullivan was an avid patron of the arts and also helped create an important Mining Resources Collection for the library.

Children's services at the library date back to 1912 when librarian, Marion Weil-Tappan, promoted children's literature and the connection between the library and public schools. In 1922, the library was fully departmentalized to include a juvenile department.

Services 

The El Paso Public Library offers many services to the public.

 Library Card
 Checking out Materials
 Databases
 Website
 eBooks
 Online Resources
 Classes
 Meeting Rooms
 Cultural Enrichment
 Free Wireless Access
 Computer and Internet Access
 Programming

Special Library Departments 

These departments of the El Paso Public Library have a specific focus and/or serve a targeted group of patrons.

Border Heritage 

The Border Heritage Center is located at the Main Library and combines the library's Southwest, RAZA and Genealogy departments into a central location. The Border Heritage Center manages several special collections, some of which are digital. In addition to these collections, the Border Heritage department provides an online newspaper headline and obituary search for years 1997 through 2011 through its  El Paso Public Library Headline & Obituary Search Page.

 El Paso Times on Microfilm: The Border Heritage Center has microfilm readers and printers for archived El Paso Times newspaper articles. For those who cannot visit the library, the Center provides mail services.
 Southwest Collection: a historical archive of materials relating to the history of the El Paso-Juarez Border region. Beginning in 1902, the library has been collecting and archiving reference works, related monographs, photographs, architectural drawings, manuscripts, clippings, vertical files, maps, periodicals, postcards and other materials as they relate to the region.
 RAZA Collection: dating back to the 1970s the RAZA collection contains works by and about Mexican Americans.
 Genealogy Collection: relating specifically to individuals and families of any nationality that lived in the El Paso-Juarez Border Region.
 Historical Documents Online: a small collection of important El Paso area historical documents is available online from the Border Heritage Center. See Historical Documents Online.
 Otis A. Aultman Photo Collection: collects the historic photographs of Aultman, who lived and worked in El Paso. Part of the collection is available online. See Otis A. Aultman digital photo collection.
 Yearbook Collection: this is an archive of El Paso area high school yearbooks. Starting in 2007 the library began to digitize this collection. Some yearbooks go back to 1885. See Digital Yearbook Collection.

Children's Services 

Children's services include special collections and programs at each branch of the system. During the summer months, the promotes an 8 week long Summer Reading Club in order to encourage literacy among children. The library was Ranked #6 in the list for Top 10 Libraries for Children by Livability.com. In addition, the library celebrates the annual  Dia de los Niños/Dia de los Libros festival for children and literacy.

Government Documents

The El Paso Public Library is currently a selective Federal Depository for Government Documents, receiving 35% of documents published by the Government Printing Office (GPO). This department is also a depository for Texas State documents starting in 1966. Some items may be checked out and others are accessible online at the library's Government Documents page. On this page are guides and resources in addition to information about the Federal Depository Program.

Teen Services 

Services specifically for teens are much newer. In the El Paso Public Library, Teen Services are created and implemented by the Teen Hangout Committee. Each library branch sends a member to the committee. Teen services include programming, special teen collections and a celebration known as TeenToberFest which is celebrated annually.

Branches 

All El Paso Public Library Branches share resources and are connected to the same database. Materials from one branch may be requested and received at another.

 Main Library (Downtown El Paso) at Oregon and Franklin
 Armijo Branch (Armijo Library) on 7th
 Richard Burges Regional Branch, on Dyer at Will Ruth
 Chamizal Community Center and Library, 2119 Cypress Ave.
 Cielo Vista Branch, on Hawkins
 Clardy Fox Branch, on Robert Alva
 Dorris Van Doren Regional Branch, on Redd Road
 Enrique Moreno Branch at Valle Bajo Community Center, 7380 Alameda
 Judge Edward S Marquez Branch, on Yarbrough
 Memorial Park Branch, on Copper
 Esperanza Acosta Moreno Regional Branch, on Pebble Hills
 Irving Schwartz Branch, on Dean Martin at Trawood
 Sergio Troncoso Branch (Ysleta) on Alameda
 Westside Branch, on Belvidere

In addition, the system offers a bookmobile service

Partnership Libraries
These libraries are a collaboration between the El Paso Public Library and another entity.

 Jenna Welch & Laura Bush Community Library (EPCC Northwest) on South Desert Blvd.

References

External links

 El Paso Public Libraries
 El Paso Public Library Began Modestly.  Borderlands article.
 Maud Sullivan Made El Paso Public Library a Cultural Center. Borderlands article.

Organizations based in El Paso, Texas
Public libraries in Texas
Education in El Paso, Texas
1894 establishments in Texas
Libraries participating in TexShare
Culture of El Paso, Texas